George Frederick Mager (February 23, 1875- April 12, 1938) was an apprentice first class serving in the United States Navy during the Spanish–American War who received the Medal of Honor for bravery.

Biography
Mager was born February 23, 1875, in Phillipsburg, New Jersey and after entering the navy was sent to fight in the Spanish–American War aboard the USS Marblehead as an apprentice first class.

He died on April 12, 1938, and is buried in Greenwood Cemetery Trenton, New Jersey.

Medal of Honor citation
Rank and organization: Apprentice First Class, U.S. Navy. Born: 23 February 1875, Philipsburg, N.J. Accredited to: New Jersey. G.O. No.: 529, 2 November 1899.

Citation:

On board the U.S.S. Marblehead during the operation of cutting the cable leading from Cienfuegos, Cuba, 11 May 1898. Facing the heavy fire of the enemy, Mager displayed extraordinary bravery and coolness throughout this action.

See also

List of Medal of Honor recipients for the Spanish–American War

References

External links

1875 births
1938 deaths
United States Navy Medal of Honor recipients
United States Navy sailors
American military personnel of the Spanish–American War
People from Phillipsburg, New Jersey
Spanish–American War recipients of the Medal of Honor